Iran competed at the 2020 Summer Paralympics in Tokyo, Japan, from 24 August to 5 September 2021. This was their ninth consecutive appearance at the Summer Paralympics since 1988.

Medalists

| width="77%" align="right" valign="top" |

| width="23%" align="left" valign="top" |

Competitors
Source:

Archery 

Iran qualified one athlete in Men's Individual W1, one athlete in Men's Individual Compound Open, two ticket in Men's Individual Recurve, one athlete in Women's Individual Compound and one athlete in Women's Individual Recurve.

Men's individual

Women's individual

Mixed team

Athletics 

16 athletes in 19 events are scheduled to represent Iran at the 2020 Summer Paralympics.

Cycling 

Iran sent one cyclist after successfully getting a slot in the 2018 UCI Nations Ranking Allocation quota for Asia.

Judo 

Iran has qualified two athletes in Men's events in 90 and +100 kg.

Canoeing 

Iran has qualified one athlete in Women's KL3 events and one athlete in Men's VL2.

Powerlifting

Shooting

Iran entered five athletes into the Paralympic competition. All of them successfully broke the Paralympic qualification at the 2018 WSPS World Championships which was held in Cheongju, South Korea, 2019 WSPS World Cup which was held in Al Ain, United Arab Emirates and 2019 WSPS World Championships which was held in Sydney, Australia.

Sitting Volleyball 

Iran's men's sitting volleyball team qualified for the 2020 Summer Paralympics after winning the 2018 World ParaVolley Championships.

Summary

Men's tournament 

Group play

Semi final

Final

Taekwondo

Iran qualified three athletes to compete at the Paralympics competition. Two of them qualified by entered top six in the world ranking, while the other athlete qualified by winning the gold medal at the 2021 Asian Qualification Tournament in Amman, Jordan.

Wheelchair basketball 

Iran's men's wheelchair basketball team qualified for the 2020 Summer Paralympics after finishing in top three at the 2019 IWBF Asia Oceania Wheelchair Basketball Championship in Pattaya, Thailand.

See also 
 Iran at the Paralympics
 Iran at the 2020 Summer Olympics

References

Nations at the 2020 Summer Paralympics
2020
2021 in Iranian sport